Kelvin Steel (born 7 June 1955) is  a former Australian rules footballer who played with Hawthorn and Essendon in the Victorian Football League (VFL).

Notes

External links 		
		
Kelvin Steel's profile at Essendonfc.com		
		
		
		
		
Living people		
1955 births		
		
Australian rules footballers from Victoria (Australia)		
Hawthorn Football Club players		
Essendon Football Club players